Florian Mayer (born 5 October 1983) is a German former professional tennis player.

Mayer reached his career-high singles ranking of world No. 18 in June 2011. Also in 2011, Mayer won his first ATP title after four previous defeats in ATP finals.

Mayer competed at the 2004 Summer Olympics. At the 2004 Wimbledon Championships, Mayer reached the quarter-finals, which is his best Grand Slam result to date. He received the ATP Newcomer of the Year award in 2004. Eight years later, Mayer made his second Grand Slam quarter-final, once again at Wimbledon.

The biggest win of his career came at the 2011 Shanghai Rolex Masters when he upset twenty-time Grand Slam champion Rafael Nadal in the round of 16.

Mayer was known for his unorthodox style of play. He had a long backswing on his forehand and backhand and used many different slices and spin on his backhand side. He was also known for his jumping backhand dropshots which caught many of his opponents on the backfoot.

Mayer retired from professional tennis after the 2018 US Open.

Career

2009
Florian made a return from injury reaching the final of the Nouméa Challenger but losing to Brendan Evans. Mayer then qualified for the main draw of the Australian Open by beating Sergei Bubka, Blaž Kavčič and Amer Delic. There he beat Lamine Ouahab in the first round, and then lost to Juan Martín del Potro in the second round.

2010
Mayer reached the third round at the 2010 Australian Open, defeating Philipp Petzschner and Viktor Troicki. He then lost to Juan Martín del Potro in four sets. At Wimbledon in 2010, Mayer beat 11th seed Marin Čilić in straight sets to reach the second round, where he defeated Mardy Fish in four sets. He then lost to Lu Yen-hsun in the third round. He also reached the quarterfinals at the Mercedes Cup in Stuttgart, losing to Gaël Monfils, and the semifinal in Hamburg, losing to eventual champion Andrey Golubev. At the Shanghai Rolex Masters, he lost to Jo-Wilfried Tsonga in the third round, after defeating Kevin Anderson and Mikhail Youzhny in the first two rounds. Mayer reached the final at the If Stockholm Open, after beating Jarkko Nieminen in a tight semifinal, saving a match point. Mayer also beat world No. 5 Robin Söderling and two-time Wimbledon quarterfinalist Feliciano López en route to the final, where he lost 4–6, 3–6, to the 16-Grand Slam titles holder Roger Federer.

He went 23–18 on the season and earned $513,955.

2011
Mayer started the new season in style. In preparation for the Australian Open. he reached the quarterfinals of the Brisbane International and the semifinals of the Medibank International in Sydney. At the first Grand Slam tournament of the season in Melbourne, Mayer surprisingly defeated Doha finalist Nikolay Davydenko in four sets, only to lose against Japanese Kei Nishikori in the second round. Two weeks later, he came through to his second semifinals of the year in Zagreb. On his way to this stage, he defeated top seed Marin Čilić, 6–3, 6–4. He lost the semifinal against countryman Michael Berrer. With this result, he was the new German no. 1 in the ATP ranking. At the 2011 BMW Open in Munich, Mayer reached his fourth career final. He was again not able to capture his maiden ATP World Tour title, after losing to Nikolay Davydenko in three sets.
Two days after this loss, he managed to beat Viktor Troicki in three sets in the first round of the Mutua Madrid Open. He had to retire in the second round against Thomaz Bellucci. He rose to a new career-high rank of no. 28.

Mayer reached the quarterfinals of the Italian Open in Rome. After three straight-set wins, Mayer could not keep up the momentum against Andy Murray, after having won the first set. He went on to lose, 6–1, 1–6, 1–6.

Again he rose to a new career-high rank of no. 21.

By winning three out of three matches at the World Team Cup in Düsseldorf, Mayer was the key player in the German team to capture the trophy for the fifth time. He improved to no. 19. 
The German, however, could not overcome the second round of Roland Garros and Wimbledon, losing in fourth sets in both cases against Alejandro Falla and Xavier Malisse, as he did in the Australian Open. In addition, he lost his Davis Cup quarterfinal match against Richard Gasquet, despite serving for the match in the third set.

Two weeks later, he reached the Hamburg ATP 500 quarterfinals, losing in straight tiebreaks to third seed Nicolás Almagro. However, in the ATP World Tour Masters 1000 of Montreal and Cincinnati, he lost in first round to Richard Gasquet and Ivo Karlović, respectively. Mayer then reached the third round in the US Open (won to Mannarino and Lisnard, but lost in the round of 32 to fifth seed Ferrer), to achieve his best Grand Slam result of the year.
He won his first title in Bucharest, defeating Pablo Andújar in the final 6–3, 6–1.
On 13 October 2011, Mayer defeated world No. 2 Rafael Nadal in a brilliant display of tennis 7–6, 6–3.

2012
Mayer withdrew from the Australian Open due to injury. He couldn't win consecutively until the Miami Masters, where he defeated Ivan Dodig and Indian Wells finalist John Isner. He then lost in the fourth round to Jo-Wilfried Tsonga.

Mayer reached the Wimbledon quarter-finals for the first time since 2004 Wimbledon. In the quarter finals, he lost to top seed Novak Djokovic.

2013
Mayer reached quarter-final of Shanghai Masters and defeated French Open finalist David Ferrer.

2014
Mayer first played in Doha. He defeated Michał Przysiężny, then third seeded Andy Murray who returned from injury layoff, then Victor Hanescu who upset Fernando Verdasco. He then lost to Gaël Monfils in the semi-finals.
He reached the fourth round for the first time at the Australian Open. He defeated 14th seed Mikhail Youzhny in the second round, then 20th seed Jerzy Janowicz in straight sets in the third round. In the fourth round, he was defeated by 3rd seed David Ferrer in 4 sets.

2016
Mayer won the Gerry Weber Open in Halle, defeating Andreas Seppi in the quarter final, world No. 7 Dominic Thiem in the semifinal and Alexander Zverev in the final, for his first victory in his career on German soil and his first victory at an ATP 500 tournament. Mayer won the final 6–2, 5–7, 6–3. As a result of this victory, Mayer's ranking rose 112 places from 192 to 80.

2017
Mayer got to the final at the 2017 German Open in Hamburg where he lost to namesake Leonardo Mayer in three sets.

2018
Mayer played his last match on the ATP tour at the 2018 US Open, losing to Borna Ćorić in four sets in the first round.

Playing style
Mayer is an all-court player known for his unique and creative style of play. He has an unusually long take-back on both his forehand and two-handed backhand and generally hits more top-spin than flat on both wings. Despite his height, his groundstrokes and serve lack power, but are consistent and unpredictable. He uses a variety of spins on both wings to mix his shots up and hit drop-shots. He is well known for his double-handed backhand slice, similar to that of Fabrice Santoro and Jimmy Connors, and often pulls off jumping backhands and jumping slice drop-shots which catch his opponents off guard. His drop-shots are particularly effective on clay and grass, where he has had most success. Despite having a weaker, top-spin serve, Mayer occasionally serve and volleys and is also known for his two-handed backhand cutting volley. He also often uses a Chip and charge tactic during points to finish points off. This makes him unpredictable and tricky to play against.

Mayer's biggest weaknesses are his lack of match consistency and fitness, having had inconsistent results throughout his career and a relatively small build. He has also suffered from numerous injuries throughout his career, most notably his groin injury in 2015 that prevented him from playing for more than a year. However, he has since made a comeback, winning his second title at the 2016 Halle Open.

ATP career finals

Singles: 7 (2 titles, 5 runner-ups)

Doubles: 1 (1 runner-up)

Team competition: 2 (2 titles)

ATP Challenger and ITF Futures finals

Singles: 25 (14–11)

Performance timelines

Singles

Doubles

Record against other players

Record against top 10 players
Mayer's record against players who have been ranked world No. 10 or higher. Only ATP Tour, Grand Slam and Davis Cup matches are considered.

Wins over top 10 players

German tournaments

References

External links
 
 
 
 
 
 
 
  

1983 births
Living people
German male tennis players
Olympic tennis players of Germany
Tennis players at the 2004 Summer Olympics
Sportspeople from Bayreuth
Tennis people from Bavaria